FC Lokomotiv Kaluga ( is a Russian football team from Kaluga that currently plays in Amateur Football League. It played professionally from 1965 to 1982 and from 1997 to 2006. Their best result was 13th place in the Soviet First League in 1968 (it played on that second-highest level from 1967 to 1969). Champion of the RSFSR in 1966 and 1977.

Team name history
 1936–1982: FC Lokomotiv Kaluga
 1996: FC Smena-PRMZ Kaluga
 1997–present: FC Lokomotiv Kaluga

External links
  Team history at KLISF (2007–2008 seasons incorrectly listed as FC MiK Kaluga, MiK is a separate club

Association football clubs established in 1936
Football clubs in Russia
Sport in Kaluga
Kaluga
1936 establishments in Russia